Eotetragonites is an extinct genus of ammonite.

Eotetragonites is considered by some authors a subgenus of Eogaudryceras.

Species
Species within this genus include:
Eotetragonites duvali (A.V.M.D. D'Orbigny ) † 
Eotetragonites raspaili Breistroffer, 1947 † 
Eotetragonites rossmatteliformis 
Eotetragonites umbilicostriatum Collignon 1949

Fossil record
The fossil record of this genus dates back to the Cretaceous (age range: from 112.6 to 99.7million years ago). Fossils of species within this genus have been found in Egypt, France, Madagascar, South Africa and United States (California). These cephalopods were fast-moving nektonic carnivores.

See also
 List of ammonite genera

References

Lytoceratina